NBC Sunday Night Football (abbreviated as SNF) is an American weekly television broadcast of National Football League (NFL) games on NBC and Peacock in the United States. It began airing on August 6, 2006, with the Pro Football Hall of Fame Game, which opened that year's preseason. NBC took over the rights to the Sunday prime time game telecasts from ESPN, which carried the broadcasts from 1987 to 2005. At the same time, ESPN began broadcasting Monday Night Football when it was dropped from sister network ABC. Previously, NBC had aired American Football League (AFL), and later American Football Conference (AFC), games from 1965 until 1997, when CBS took over those rights.

During the 2011–12 season, Sunday Night Football became the first sports program to hold the position as Nielsen's most-watched program on U.S. network television during the year, beating American Idol, which held that honor for eight consecutive seasons beginning in 2004; Sunday Night Football repeated this feat three years running, beginning with the 2013–14 season.

As of 2022, Mike Tirico serves as the play-by-play announcer for most broadcasts while Al Michaels does so for special events, Cris Collinsworth serves as color commentator, and Melissa Stark serves as the sideline reporter, with Terry McAulay serving as the rules expert. Upon NBC's assumption of the Sunday prime time game rights, Michaels, John Madden, Fred Gaudelli, and Drew Esocoff, who served as the respective play-by-play announcer, color commentator, lead producer, and director, joined SNF in the same positions they held during the latter portion of the ABC era of Monday Night Football. Madden retired prior to the 2009 season, and was succeeded in that role by Collinsworth. Tirico succeeded Michaels following Super Bowl LVI in 2021.

Since 2014, sister cable channel Universo has carried Spanish-language simulcasts of select games, after years of aborted attempts to simulcast the games on Telemundo. As with the NFL's other television partners, NBC provides Spanish-language audio feed of the game broadcasts via second audio program (SAP), formerly noted as being "provided by Telemundo" before the rebranding of that entity's sports division to Telemundo Deportes. With the former mun2's relaunch on February 1, 2015, Universo began to carry the full season with the start of the 2015 season and simulcast Super Bowl XLIX, the channel carrying Spanish-language simulcasts of NFL games and NBC Sports properties. Telemundo would later carry Spanish language broadcasts of select games, beginning in 2021, with an NFL Super Wild Card game. Telemundo also broadcast Super Bowl LVI in 2022.

Studio show

NBC's broadcast begins at 7 p.m. Eastern Time with its pre-game show, which runs until kickoff (which usually occurs around 8:20 p.m. Eastern). The show serves the same purpose as NFL Primetime did for ESPN, offering recaps of the early action as well as a preview of the game to come. The show emanates from the NBC Sports studios in Connecticut as well as at the game site. Maria Taylor, Tony Dungy, Jason Garrett, Chris Simms and Mike Florio broadcast from the studio while Jac Collinsworth and Rodney Harrison report from the game. Tirico, Collinsworth and Stark will also appear.

In 2021, a post-game show began airing on NBC's Peacock streaming service under the name Peacock Sunday Night Football Final. It is hosted by Kathryn Tappen and Chris Simms.

Contract
The network's current NFL contract includes the rights to the season-opening Thursday night NFL Kickoff Game, another game played on Thanksgiving Night, and three playoff games, two in the Super Wild Card round and one in the Divisional Playoffs. Under the initial 6-year deal, the network was also awarded the rights to two Super Bowl games, following the 2008 (Super Bowl XLIII) and 2011 (Super Bowl XLVI) seasons, and the Pro Bowl games in the years which NBC was slated to air the Super Bowl and two more Pro Bowls in 2013 and 2014. Beginning in 2012, through an extension to the contract that runs through 2022, NBC also gained the rights to air a primetime Thanksgiving game (which had previously been part of NFL Network's Thursday Night Football package), one divisional playoff game in lieu of a Wild Card game in the postseason, and the rights to Super Bowls held in 2015 (Super Bowl XLIX), 2018 (Super Bowl LII), and 2022 (Super Bowl LVI). However, the Pro Bowl is not excluded in the new contract as ESPN was set to gain exclusive rights to the game in 2015, with NBC's broadcast of the 2014 Pro Bowl being the final time the game would air on broadcast television prior to ABC's simulcast with ESPN on the 2018 edition. NBC regained rights to air two Super Wild Card games, beginning with the 2020–21 postseason. The Sunday Night game also aired on Telemundo, NBC's Spanish network, and was able to be streamed on NBCUniversal's streaming service Peacock. On March 18, 2021, a new television deal with the NFL was reached with CBS, Fox, NBC, and ESPN/ABC. The new deal allows NBC to retain its NFL rights with a continuation of Sunday Night Football, including the Kickoff Game and the annual Thanksgiving Night game, expanded streaming rights for Peacock, which includes an additional game for the first 6 seasons of the new deal. NBC also gained three more Super Bowls, which air in 2026 (for Super Bowl LX), 2030 (for Super Bowl LXIV), and 2034 (for Super Bowl LXVIII), all in Winter Olympic years. The new deal will run through 2033.

NBC is the current home of the annual Pro Football Hall of Fame Game, which begins the NFL's preseason each August. Usually the game is aired on the Sunday after the Hall of Fame Induction Ceremony the night before. In 2017, the game was moved to the Thursday before the Induction Ceremony, which made the game the official start of Hall of Fame Weekend. Due to NBC's broadcast commitments to the Summer Olympics, every four years the game is moved to either the NFL Network or in 2021, Fox Sports. One preseason game (the Hall of Fame game). But only one preseason game was shown in 2021. The Thursday night season opener was retained as part of the new contract that began in 2014. The Thursday Night season opener and the Thanksgiving Night Game will be retained as part of the new contract beginning in 2023.

From 2006 until 2013, NBC's contract included the rights to both Saturday wild card playoff games that had been previously aired by ABC as part of its Monday Night Football contract. Tom Hammond provided play-by-play for the early game until 2012, with Dan Hicks taking the position in 2013. Cris Collinsworth was the initial color commentator for these broadcasts, doing so until 2008 when he replaced John Madden as lead analyst in 2009. Mike Mayock, NBC's Notre Dame color commentator until 2012, took over as color commentator in 2013. In 2020, NBC gained rights to the Saturday and Sunday night Super Wild Card games, with one of those games being called by the Notre Dame Football crew consisting of Mike Tirico (calling his first NFL playoff game since the 2015–16 postseason when he was at ESPN/ABC, and first at NBC), and Tony Dungy (calling his first ever NFL playoff game).

Scheduling

Opening game
The first regular season game to be shown by NBC under this contract, between the Miami Dolphins and the Pittsburgh Steelers, aired on September 7, 2006, followed by the first Sunday-night game – between the Indianapolis Colts and New York Giants – on September 10, 2006. The actual first game of the run – the 2006 Pro Football Hall of Fame Game between the Oakland Raiders and Philadelphia Eagles – was televised on August 6, 2006.

Flexible scheduling
NBC Sunday Night Football is the beneficiary of the league's new flexible-scheduling system. Since the NFL now considers SNF to be its featured game of the week, for the final seven weeks of the season (seven of the final eight weeks during the 2006, 2011, 2016 2017 and 2022 seasons because of Christmas weekend), the NFL has the flexibility in selecting games that are more intriguing and typically have playoff implications to air on Sunday night.

Connections to other sports

World Series conflicts
In its first four seasons of Sunday night coverage, NBC took one week off in late October or early November, so as not to conflict with Fox's coverage of baseball's World Series. In 2006, NBC did not air a game on October 22, which was the scheduled date for Game 2 of the 2006 World Series, but a potential conflict still existed on October 29 had the series gone to a game seven (the conflict never arose, however, as the Cardinals won the World Series in five). With the change in World Series scheduling beginning in 2007, NBC did not air an NFL game in order to avoid a conflict with Game 4 of the World Series, which is the first chance a team would have to clinch the series. In 2007, there was no game on October 28; in 2008, there was no game on October 26; and, in 2009, there was no game on November 1. Although no games aired on these nights, Football Night in America still aired as scheduled at 7:00 p.m. Eastern.

NBC televised a game on October 31, 2010 and again on October 23, 2011, opposite Game 4 of the World Series on Fox in both cases. Both games featured the New Orleans Saints at home, first in 2010 against the Pittsburgh Steelers, then in 2011 against the Indianapolis Colts. New Orleans and Indianapolis do not have a Major League Baseball team, and the Pittsburgh Pirates had poor seasonal performances in those recent years, at the time having not recorded a winning record since 1992.

Ratings have been mixed for these results, with the NFL winning the night in 2010 while MLB won in 2011. While the Saints won both games, the former matchup featuring a major ratings draw in the Steelers, combined with the latter matchup against the Colts being a 62–7 blowout while Game 4 of the 2011 World Series between the St. Louis Cardinals and Texas Rangers was a more closely contested game, caused the ratings to slip in 2011.

In 2012, the NFL once again scheduled the Saints to play on SNF in late October, this time against the Denver Broncos at Sports Authority Field at Mile High on October 28 (Denver does have an MLB team, the Colorado Rockies, that had limited success in recent seasons, though they did not contend for the National League West in 2012). The game wound up being scheduled opposite the fourth (and final) game of the 2012 World Series.

For 2013, SNF aired the Green Bay Packers-Minnesota Vikings rivalry game at the Hubert H. Humphrey Metrodome on October 27, opposite Game 4 of the 2013 World Series. Both the Packers and Vikings have a baseball team in their respective home states (Wisconsin's Milwaukee Brewers and Minnesota's Twins), but the two Major League Baseball teams struggled in 2013.

The 2014 game, between the Packers and Saints in New Orleans, was scheduled against Game 5 of the 2014 World Series, which under the seven-game format would be played only if necessary (a split in the first two games between the San Francisco Giants and Kansas City Royals assured the series would need at least five games to determine a champion). Major League Baseball moved the start of the series to a Tuesday instead of Wednesday so it could avoid competing with the NFL on Thursday and Monday nights in addition to Sunday night.

In 2015, the NFL once again scheduled the Packers to play on SNF, this time against the Broncos at Sports Authority Field at Mile High on November 1. Both the Packers and the Broncos entered the game undefeated at 6-0. However, the game wound up being scheduled opposite the fifth (and final) game of the 2015 World Series between the Royals and the New York Mets that night. Both the Packers and the Broncos have a baseball team in their respective home states (Wisconsin's Milwaukee Brewers and Colorado's Rockies), but both of those MLB teams performed poorly that season.

For 2016, SNF aired the Philadelphia Eagles-Dallas Cowboys rivalry game at AT&T Stadium on October 30, opposite to Game 5 of the 2016 World Series between the Cleveland Indians and the Chicago Cubs. Both the Eagles and the Cowboys have a baseball team in their respective home cities (Philadelphia's Phillies and Dallas's Texas Rangers, the latter plays their home games at nearby Globe Life Park in Arlington, Texas). The Phillies did not contend for the National League East in 2016, while the Rangers won the American League West title that season, but they lost in three games to the Toronto Blue Jays in the ALDS; on the other hand, the Cleveland Browns and the Chicago Bears, the NFL franchises of the participating World Series cities, were performing at the bottom of its respective divisions in recent years, with the Browns' issues dating back to the team's return to the league in 1999. As for the two games that aired simultaneously on October 30, the Cubs beat the Indians, 3-2, to force a Game 6 of the World Series on November 1, while the Cowboys beat the Eagles, 29-23, in overtime.

In 2017, the NFL once again scheduled the Steelers to play on SNF, this time against the Detroit Lions on October 29. This game aired opposite Game 5 of the 2017 World Series between the Los Angeles Dodgers and the Houston Astros. Both the Steelers and the Lions have a baseball team in their respective home cities (Pittsburgh's Pirates and Detroit's Tigers, the latter plays their home games at nearby Comerica Park in Detroit), but neither of their baseball counterparts did well that season; as for the NFL franchises of the participating World Series cities, the Rams (who moved back to Los Angeles from St. Louis in 2016) were in contention for the NFC West through Week 8 of the 2017 season (meanwhile, Los Angeles' other team, the Chargers, who moved from San Diego in 2017, were struggling at that same point of the season) while the Houston Texans, who had reached the playoffs the previous two seasons, also struggled. As for the two games that aired simultaneously on October 29, the Steelers beat the Lions, 20-15, while in Game 5 of the World Series, the Astros beat the Dodgers, 13-12, in 10 innings, however, the win was brought under heavy scrutiny after it was discovered the Astros used whistles to tip off hitters of what pitch was coming during the game, as well as using trash cans during the season.

In 2018, for the fifth time, the NFL scheduled the Saints to play on the Sunday Night Football-World Series competition game, this time, against the Vikings, in a rematch of the Minneapolis Miracle game. However this game wound up being scheduled opposite the fifth (and final) game of the 2018 World Series, between the Los Angeles Dodgers season and the Red Sox that night. The city of Minneapolis does have an MLB team, however, the Twins failed to qualify for the postseason in 2018. As for the city of New Orleans, they do not have an MLB team. As for the teams that are playing, the Red Sox, put up the best record in MLB, while the city's football team, the Patriots, were riding a 5-2 record through 7 games. The Dodgers meanwhile clinched the National League pennant for the second consecutive year, as for the city's two teams, the Rams were at the time, the last undefeated team in the NFL at 7-0, while the Chargers started 5-2 and were half a game back with the arch-rival Chiefs in the AFC West race (the Chiefs won the AFC West title that season before losing to the eventual Super Bowl LIII champion Patriots in the AFC Championship Game). The Rams would go on to controversially win the NFC Championship Game in overtime, but then lose to the Patriots in Super Bowl LIII.

In 2019, for the fourth time, the NFL scheduled the Packers to play on the Sunday Night Football–World Series competition game, this time against the Chiefs, in a rematch of Super Bowl I. This game aired opposite Game 5 of the 2019 World Series between the Houston Astros and the Washington Nationals. Both the Packers and the Chiefs have a baseball team in their respective home states (Wisconsin's Milwaukee Brewers made the postseason, but lost to the eventual World Series Champion Nationals in the NL Wild Card Game, and Missouri's Kansas City Royals, failed to make the playoffs for the fourth consecutive season). As for the two games that aired simultaneously on October 27, the Packers beat the Chiefs, 31–24, while in Game 5 of the World Series (of which the series itself was tied at 2-2), the Astros beat the Nationals, 7–1 heading into Game 6 of the World Series on October 29.

In 2020, for the first time ever, the NFL flexed a game that was scheduled against the Fall Classic. The league flexed the Seattle Seahawks-Arizona Cardinals game to the Sunday Night Football–World Series competition game, in place of the originally scheduled Tampa Bay Buccaneers versus Las Vegas Raiders game which was flexed out due to the Raiders having a COVID-19 outbreak. This game aired opposite Game 5 of the 2020 World Series between the Tampa Bay Rays and the Los Angeles Dodgers. Las Vegas does not have an MLB team, while Arizona, Seattle, and Tampa Bay all have teams. As for those two games the Cardinals came from behind to beat Seattle 37–34 in overtime, while in Game 5 of the World Series (of which the series itself was tied at 2–2), the Dodgers beat the Rays, 4–2.  Two days later, the Dodgers won again by a score of 3-1, giving the franchise its first championship since 1988.

For the 2021 season, the NFL scheduled the Dallas Cowboys-Minnesota Vikings game as the Sunday Night Football World Series competition game. This was the first time since 2016 and 2018 respectively that both teams played on SNF against the Fall Classic. This game aired opposite Game 5 of the 2021 World Series between the Atlanta Braves and the Houston Astros. While Dallas and Minnesota have MLB teams in their respective home states, both the Rangers and Twins performed poorly that season.  The Astros won that game, 9-5, to stay alive in the series, but lost two days later as the Braves won their first title since 1995.

In the 2022 season, for the first time since 2008, there was not one occurrence in which both a SNF game and a World Series game occurred on the same day, but the first time in which only the NFL games were played.  Originally, the NFL had scheduled the Green Bay Packers-Buffalo Bills game as the competing contest, to be played on October 30; however, with Major League Baseball starting the World Series on October 28, and in part due to the lockout before the season, that day became a travel day.  The 2022 World Series between the Philadelphia Phillies and the Houston Astros began on a Friday instead of Tuesday, as in past years. Since Minute Maid Park, the venue at which the series began, has a retractable roof, as expected neither of the first two games were postponed.  However, Game 3 (the first game after the series shifted to Philadelphia) was postponed on October 31; at that time, MLB announced that all remaining games would be played one day later than scheduled.  This created a possible conflict between Game 7 and the November 6 contest between the Tennessee Titans and the Kansas City Chiefs.  But this was averted when, the night before, the Astros defeated the Phillies 4-1 to win the title, their second in six seasons with the other being in the infamous 2017 season.  The closest MLB team to the Packers is the Milwaukee Brewers, in a market officially shared with them, while the Bills' closest MLB neighbors are the Toronto Blue Jays.  The latter two cities are interconnected in both sports; the 2020 and 2021 teams played some home games in Buffalo due to the COVID-19 pandemic, while the Bills once played select home games at Rogers Centre in Toronto. Tennessee doesn't have a neighboring MLB team, while the Kansas City Royals, the neighboring MLB team in Kansas City, had a losing record for the seventh season in a row in 2022, covering every season since its last World Series title in 2015.

With NASCAR
On October 23, 2022, for the first time, NBC showed a NASCAR Cup Series race and an SNF game from the same metropolitan area on the same day.  In a race that started at 2:30 p.m. Eastern time, Kyle Larson won the Dixie Vodka 400 at Homestead–Miami Speedway; then in  a game that kicked off at 8:25 (a few minutes later than usual due to ceremonies honoring the 1972 Miami Dolphins, still the only NFL team to complete an undefeated season including playoffs), the Miami Dolphins defeated the Pittsburgh Steelers, 16-10 at Hard Rock Stadium.  Both venues are in Miami-Dade County, Florida.

With the NHL
The SNF game on September 27, 2020 between the Green Bay Packers and the New Orleans Saints prompted the National Hockey League to schedule games 4 and 5 of the 2020 Stanley Cup Finals on the previous two days back-to-back, as NBC was contractually required to air all potential series-clinchers over-the-air. This was the result of the NHL season being paused for over four months due to the COVID-19 pandemic earlier, causing an atypical conflict between the sports.

With the NBA
In the same 2020 NFL season, two games of the NBA Finals, broadcast on ABC, went up against SNF games: Philadelphia Eagles versus San Francisco 49ers on October 4 (Game 3) and Minnesota Vikings versus Seattle Seahawks on October 11 (Game 6, which was also the clinching win for the Los Angeles Lakers).  This was the result of the NBA season being suspended for more than four months due to the COVID-19 pandemic earlier, causing an atypical conflict between the sports.

2000s

2006
In the 2006 season, in addition to the World Series off-week, there was no game scheduled for Christmas Eve night; NBC broadcast that week's game (Eagles at Cowboys) on Christmas afternoon instead. A half-hour version of Football Night in America aired before the Christmas game and the two "Wild Card Saturday" games. During the 2006 season, no game was initially scheduled for NBC in the affected weeks – instead, the schedule slot for the NBC game was left vacant, with one Sunday afternoon game being moved to the primetime slot (the schedule for the affected weeks simply read "one of these games will move to 8:15 Eastern"). CBS and Fox could each protect four of its games during Weeks 10 through 15 and also each protect one of its games for Week 17; however, these two networks had to decide which games to protect in early October 2006, after Week 4 of the NFL season.

2007
For the first time since NBC gained the rights to SNF, a tentative full-season schedule was unveiled, including games in the last seven weeks of the season. Those games could be replaced under flexible scheduling if the need arose. The same rules under which CBS and Fox protect games for their own packages still apply.

Three of the games in the last seven weeks of the season were eventually replaced with more compelling matches. This resulted in the situation – twice – of having a team playing on consecutive Sunday nights. New England had consecutive Sunday nighters: the November 18 New England at Buffalo game was moved to prime time and was followed on November 25 by the already-scheduled Philadelphia at New England game. Likewise, the Washington Redskins played a scheduled game at the New York Giants on December 16, and their December 23 game in Minnesota was moved to prime time. For the last week of the season, the Tennessee Titans–Indianapolis Colts game was moved, switching places with the Kansas City Chiefs–New York Jets game that was originally scheduled in the Sunday night slot; the Titans needed a win to secure the final AFC playoff spot.

In addition, the annual preseason Pro Football Hall of Fame Game telecast was shifted to NFL Network, in anticipation of NBC airing the China Bowl contest from Beijing; however, the China Bowl was canceled.

2008
The 2008 schedule, released on April 15, continued the 2007 practice of a scheduled game possibly being moved in favor of a more compelling one during Weeks 11 through 16 (November 16 through December 21), but left the slot open on the final Sunday, December 28. The NFL Kickoff Game between the Washington Redskins and defending Super Bowl champion New York Giants that was played on September 4 started at 7 p.m. Eastern Time instead of the normal 8:30 p.m. time in order to avoid conflict with the nomination speech that John McCain gave at the Republican National Convention that night; the game ended at 10:01 p.m. Eastern Time, averting any conflict.

As had happened in 2007, a team played on consecutive Sunday nights due to a game being moved into the Sunday night time slot. The originally scheduled New York Giants-Dallas Cowboys game on December 14 was followed by a flexed December 21 home game for the Giants against the Carolina Panthers; the Giants-Panthers game was flexed because it carried serious playoff implications, as the winner clinches the NFC's top seed and home-field advantage throughout the NFC playoffs. This was the second of three flexed games, with a December 7 inter-conference match-up between the Baltimore Ravens and Washington Redskins displacing a New England Patriots at Seattle Seahawks game. The league filled the open spot on December 28 with a game between the Denver Broncos and San Diego Chargers with major playoff implications, as the winner of that game would win the AFC West while the loser would be eliminated.

2009
The 2009 schedule, released on April 14, continued the 2007 and 2008 practice of scheduling a game every Sunday night during the season (except during the World Series) but declaring the games in Weeks 11 through 16 (November 22 through December 27) subject to change, should a more compelling matchup arise. The pattern of the 2007 and 2008 schedules was continued, as the slot for the final Sunday night of the season – January 3, 2010 – was left vacant. Two games were "flexed" in the 2009 season, as the Minnesota Vikings–Arizona Cardinals game replaced the original December 6 matchup between the New England Patriots and Miami Dolphins.

To fill the vacant game slot for the last week of the season, NBC was given the matchup between the Cincinnati Bengals and New York Jets that was originally scheduled for 4:15 p.m. Eastern on CBS, with this game having playoff implications for both teams. For the Jets, a win would have put them in the playoffs, while the Bengals had the potential to improve their seeding for the playoffs with a victory. The Jets-Bengals game ended up being the last game played at Giants Stadium (the Jets could have hosted the AFC Championship Game, but the Baltimore Ravens lost in the Divisional Round to the Indianapolis Colts).

2010s

2010
The 2010 schedule, released on April 20, placed a Sunday night game (Pittsburgh Steelers at New Orleans Saints) against a World Series game for the first time since the NBC Sunday night contract began. It also continued the previous practice of scheduling a Sunday night game during every week of the season, and declaring the games in Weeks 11 through 16 (November 21 through December 26) as "flex games", meaning they reverted to Sunday afternoon if a more attractive matchup arose.

The Week 16 game, between the Minnesota Vikings and Philadelphia Eagles, originally scheduled for December 26, was moved to December 28 due to a major blizzard that affected most of the Eastern United States. The NFL postponed the game after Philadelphia Mayor Michael Nutter declared a snow emergency for the city. It was the 23rd NFL game to be played on a Tuesday, but the first since . This was the only game, outside of the final Sunday night, to be "flexed" in the 2010 season; the original schedule called for the San Diego Chargers to play the Bengals in Cincinnati (the game was moved to CBS, and was indeed blacked out in Cincinnati). Because of this, a full 90-minute edition of Football Night aired on December 26, with a short five-minute pre-game leading into the game on the 28th, while Faith Hill's introduction was not played due to time constraints before kickoff.

For the Week 17 matchup, NBC featured the 7–8 St. Louis Rams playing the 6–9 Seattle Seahawks in a win-and-in game, where the winner of the game would qualify for the playoffs as the NFC West champion while the loser would be eliminated. The Seattle Seahawks defeated the St. Louis Rams by a score of 16-6, thus advancing to the playoffs whilst the Rams were eliminated from playoff contention.

2011
The 2011 schedule, released on April 19, once again placed a Sunday night game (Indianapolis Colts at New Orleans Saints on October 23, the fourth straight time these teams played each other on national television) opposite a World Series game. Sunday night games between November 13 and December 18 (inclusive) were "flex games", which could have reverted to Sunday afternoon if a more competitive matchup arose (one was; see below). The final Sunday night of the season – January 1, 2012 – was likewise a "flex game"; the slot, vacant when the schedule was released, was filled by the game between the Dallas Cowboys and the New York Giants (see below). The Hall of Fame Game scheduled for August 7, and to be shown on NBC, was canceled due to the lockout that offseason; it was the only game to be affected.

The NFL announced on November 8 that the Week 13 rivalry game between the Indianapolis Colts and New England Patriots was moved to 1 p.m. Eastern on CBS, while a replacement game would be announced by November 22. This was due to the Colts struggling without their star quarterback Peyton Manning (without him, the Colts lost 62–7 to the New Orleans Saints in a Sunday night game on October 23). This also marked the first time the NFL announced that a Sunday night game was being moved to the afternoon without simultaneously announcing a replacement. On November 21, the matchup between the Detroit Lions and New Orleans Saints was flexed into the Sunday night slot. As compensation to Fox because they only had two other games in the early time slot, the league gave them the Denver Broncos–Minnesota Vikings game that was originally to air on CBS. This was the first time that the league moved an inter-conference telecast to the home team's Sunday afternoon regional broadcaster.

On November 14, the NFL decided to keep the Week 12 matchup between the Pittsburgh Steelers and Kansas City Chiefs on November 27 in place after the league considered flexing it out for other matchups, particularly the AFC East showdown between the Buffalo Bills and the New York Jets and the interconference matchup between the Tampa Bay Buccaneers and the Tennessee Titans, due to the AFC West (of which the Chiefs are a member) being a weak division for 2011.

On December 7, the NFL ended up keeping the Week 15 match-up between the Baltimore Ravens and the San Diego Chargers on December 18, a decision that came a day late due to the NFL Committees meetings that took place on the day before. NBC wanted the game between the New England Patriots and the Denver Broncos as it featured a matchup between Tom Brady and Tim Tebow, two players with high popularity. While CBS did not protect that game, the network was fighting to keep the game since they had lost the aforementioned Week 13 Broncos-Vikings game to Fox, denying the network the earlier chance to capitalize on Tebow's marketability.

For the second consecutive season, and third overall, the last Sunday night game that was flexed in featured a contest in which the winner became the division champions and earn a home game in the playoffs while the loser was eliminated. This particular matchup was for the NFC East between the New York Giants and the Dallas Cowboys at MetLife Stadium, a rematch of Week 14's Sunday night broadcast. This was the first time NBC had shown both meetings of division rivals during a regular season.

The 2011 season ended with an average of 20.7 million viewers and was the highest-rated program of the 2011–12 television season, dethroning American Idol, which was the highest-rated program for eight consecutive seasons. As a further result, Sunday Night Football became the first-ever television sports series of any kind to finish a television season as the most-watched show.

2012
The 2012 schedule, released on April 17, once again placed a Sunday night game (New Orleans Saints at Denver Broncos) against a World Series game. This was the third straight year a World Series game competed against a Sunday night game. During the halftime of that game, NBC News aired a brief special report regarding Superstorm Sandy, anchored by Brian Williams. Sunday night games between November 18 and December 23 (inclusive) were "flex games"; they would revert to Sunday afternoon if a more competitive matchup arose.

The only flexed game of the season that displaced a scheduled game took place on December 23; the San Diego Chargers at New York Jets game reverted to the afternoon, and the San Francisco 49ers played in Seattle that night. This resulted in the 49ers playing on consecutive Sunday nights, both on the road (the team played in New England the previous Sunday night, December 16). A portion of the 49ers-Patriots game aired on the NBC Sports Network and CNBC due to NBC News' live coverage of Barack Obama's speech following the Sandy Hook Elementary School shooting.

The final Sunday night of the season – December 30, 2012 – likewise was a "flex game"; the slot was left vacant when the schedule was released, as has been the practice of the past four seasons. It was filled by the game between the Dallas Cowboys and the Washington Redskins. Usually announced on the Tuesday before game day (but sometimes before), the game typically highlighted a situation in which the winner advanced to the playoffs while the loser did not; the winner of this flex game would win its division, although the Redskins would have still advanced to the playoffs as a wild card team – even if the team lost – if certain other teams lost. After the first 15 games were played that day, which included the Minnesota Vikings clinching the #6 seed in the NFC with a win, the game turned out to be a winner-take-all, in which the winner clinched the No. 4 seed in the NFC and the loser was eliminated regardless. The Redskins eventually defeated the Cowboys 28–18 and clinched their first NFC East crown since 1999.

2013
The 2013 schedule, released on April 18, once again placed a Sunday night game (Green Bay Packers at Minnesota Vikings) against a World Series game. This was the fourth straight year that a World series game competed against a Sunday night game. Sunday night games between November 17 and December 22 (inclusive) were "flex games", they would revert to Sunday afternoon if a more competitive matchup arose. The final Sunday night of the season – December 29, 2013 – likewise was a "flex game"; the slot was left vacant when the schedule was released, as has been the practice of the past five seasons. The game site (and, by extension, its teams) was determined after the completion of most Week 16 games. It was filled by the game between the Philadelphia Eagles and the Dallas Cowboys.

The league announced on November 1, 2013, that the Week 11 Kansas City Chiefs–Denver Broncos game, originally scheduled as CBS's only late 4:05 p.m. Eastern Time single-header game, was flexed into the Sunday Night Football, replacing the originally scheduled Green Bay Packers–New York Giants game. CBS originally selected the Chiefs–Broncos match-up as one of their "protected games" from flex-scheduling, but later allowed the league to flex it so it could be seen by a national audience. This would be one of two cases of a team playing on consecutive Sunday nights due to one of the games being moved into the Sunday night slot (as the Broncos would play the New England Patriots the following Sunday night); the Philadelphia Eagles, the other team to play on consecutive Sunday nights, played at home against the Chicago Bears on December 22 and played in Dallas on December 29.

On December 2, 2013, the Pittsburgh Tribune-Review reported (via Twitter) that the Week 15 rivalry game between the Steelers and the Cincinnati Bengals for December 15 would remain in the Sunday night slot, a report later confirmed by the NFL. The league had considered flexing the game out due to the Steelers starting the season 0-4, which included a 20-10 loss to the Bengals on Monday Night Football earlier in the season that was more of a blowout than the final score indicated. Ultimately, it was decided to keep the rematch in the Sunday night slot due to the Steelers making a late playoff push, the team's fanbase that provides high ratings regardless of how well the Steelers are doing, as well as a lack of compelling match-ups for the week, with only two other pairings that did not have a team with a losing record by the flex deadline (Patriots at Miami Dolphins and Baltimore Ravens at Detroit Lions, the latter being a Monday night game which could not be flexed out of its slot).

On December 10, 2013, the NFL decided to flex the Week 16 Chicago Bears-Philadelphia Eagles matchup into the Sunday night slot, replacing the New England Patriots-Baltimore Ravens match-up, which moved to the late afternoon slot on CBS. The move surprised many in the television industry, as all four teams were strong playoff contenders. Some have speculated that since the Patriots had an opportunity to lock up the AFC East before their game in Baltimore (the Patriots were ultimately upset by the Dolphins 24-20), while the other three teams would not be able to clinch playoff spots (nor would they be eliminated) prior to Week 16, that the Bears-Eagles match-up might be more compelling. There was also speculation that moving the Patriots-Ravens game to the late afternoon slot on CBS gives that network a more compelling match-up in their week to have a doubleheader, as the other two match-ups scheduled to air on CBS in the late afternoon slot featured teams that were having down years (Steelers-Packers) or weren't expected to contend for the playoffs and only appealed to their home markets (Raiders-Chargers); the Patriots-Ravens match-up ultimately received CBS's lead broadcasting crew (Jim Nantz and Phil Simms) and national coverage outside the local markets and blacked out markets of the other late games. John Ourand of SportsBusiness Journal reported that the league wanted to keep the total number of games taken from CBS and Fox, dating back to the start of the current television contracts, roughly equal. Otherwise, an obscure rule in the broadcast contracts would have prevented the league from possibly flexing a Week 17 AFC game, originally scheduled to be televised on CBS, to the final Sunday night slot.

No Sunday night Game was originally scheduled for Week 17 of the NFL season, thus allowing the ability to move the most intriguing and playoff-relevant matchup of the week to the Sunday night time slot. The final game of the 2013 NFL regular season was played on December 29, 2013 between the Philadelphia Eagles and Dallas Cowboys to determine the NFC East division champion while the loser was eliminated. The Eagles won 24-22, thus advancing to the playoffs, eliminating the Cowboys.

2014
When the 2014 NFL schedule was released on April 23, it placed a Sunday night game (Green Bay Packers at New Orleans Saints) against a World Series game for the fifth straight year. Starting with this season, NBC was permitted to begin flexing games as soon as Week 5, with the restriction that no more than two games may be flexed between Weeks 5 and 10. The final Sunday night of the season – December 28, 2014 – likewise was a flex game; the slot was left vacant when the schedule was released, as had been the practice of the past six seasons. The game's teams (and, by extension, its location) was announced after most week 16 games it was filled by the Cincinnati Bengals and Pittsburgh Steelers. Country/pop superstar Carrie Underwood continued her role as the performer of the Sunday Night Football opener.

On November 11, 2014, the NFL announced that the November 23 game between the Dallas Cowboys and New York Giants game would air as scheduled, even though the Detroit Lions–New England Patriots game was considered to be a better match-up, citing that the Cowboys are one of the most popular NFL teams playing in the country's largest media market.

For the first time since flexed scheduling went into effect, no Sunday night games were flexed during the season other than Week 17 (where the match-up is usually determined as late as six days prior to the Sunday of Week 17).

On December 21, 2014, the NFL announced that the rivalry game between the Pittsburgh Steelers and Cincinnati Bengals would be flexed into the Week 17 Sunday Night Football slot, with the winner clinching the AFC North. The league considered flexing the Atlanta Falcons–Carolina Panthers game into the Sunday night slot as it decided the NFC South while the loser was eliminated, but the division being historically weak (it was assured to have a division winner with a losing record by the end of Week 16), combined with the Steelers being a major draw, led to the league's decision. With the Steelers and Bengals clinching a playoff spot in Week 16, it also marked the first time since the NFL scheduled all-intradivisional match-ups in Week 17 in 2010 that a game flexed to the Week 17 slot featured at least one team (in this case both) that was already in the playoffs. It was later reported by Sports Illustrated columnist Peter King that the league chose to flex the Steelers-Bengals game because CBS has not had a game flexed in the Week 17 slot since 2009; the aforementioned Falcons-Panthers match-up was later flexed to CBS as part of the new television contract that allows intraconference match-ups to be flexed between CBS and Fox.

2015
The 2015 schedule was released on April 21, 2015. The defending Super Bowl champions the New England Patriots faced the Pittsburgh Steelers during the NFL Kickoff Game on Thursday, September 10, 2015. Other notable games included the Seattle Seahawks versus the Green Bay Packers (Week 2) and the New England Patriots versus the Indianapolis Colts (Week 6) in a rematch of their respective conference championship games. It also placed a Sunday night game (Green Bay Packers at Denver Broncos) against a World Series game for the sixth straight year. The final Sunday night game of the season – January 3, 2016 – likewise was a flex game; the slot was left vacant when the schedule came out as has been the practice over the past seven seasons. The game's teams (and by extension, its location) was announced after most Week 16 games. It was filled by the Minnesota Vikings at Green Bay Packers. The Arizona Cardinals wound up playing on consecutive Sunday nights — at the Seattle Seahawks in Week 10 and then, at home against the Cincinnati Bengals in Week 11 (Cardinals won both of those games), with the latter being flexed into the Sunday night slot.  The December 20 game (Cincinnati Bengals at San Francisco 49ers) reverted to the afternoon, replaced by the Arizona Cardinals-Philadelphia Eagles game. The Minnesota Vikings wounded up playing on consecutive Sunday nights beginning in Week 16 at home against the New York Giants and on the road in Week 17 against the Green Bay Packers.

2016
The 2016 schedule was released on April 14, 2016. NBC's first telecast of the season featured a rematch of Super Bowl 50 when the Denver Broncos played host to the Carolina Panthers, the first time the Super Bowl participants faced each other in Week 1 of the subsequent year since 1970. It also placed a Sunday night game (Philadelphia Eagles at Dallas Cowboys) against a World Series game for the seventh straight year. The Thanksgiving night match-up featured the Pittsburgh Steelers against the Indianapolis Colts, and for the first time since 2011, NBC carried a Christmas Day game as the Broncos traveled to play the Kansas City Chiefs, a rematch of the Week 12 game in Denver that was flexed into that week's Sunday night slot. In addition, NBC carried five late season Thursday Night Football games in conjunction with NFL Network in a similar arrangement to the one NFLN has with CBS. As before, flexible scheduling rules went into effect in Week 5, with Week 16 excluded because the majority of the schedule was played on Christmas Eve. The final Sunday night game of the season – Sunday, January 1, 2017 – likewise was a flex game; the slot was left vacant when the schedule came out as has been the practice over the past eight seasons. The game's teams (and by extension, its location) was announced after most Week 16 games. It was filled by the Green Bay Packers at Detroit Lions.

Also this season, NBC was home to two Super Bowl rematches. As previously mentioned, the Carolina vs. Denver game was a rematch of Super Bowl 50. Then, 9 weeks later on a Sunday night, the Patriots hosted the Seattle Seahawks in a rematch of Super Bowl XLIX, a game that was also seen on NBC, on February 1, 2015.

The Week 5 game between the New York Giants and the Green Bay Packers was placed against the second presidential debate.  The debate did not air on NBC due to contractual obligations; however, it was carried by several other channels including sister networks CNBC and MSNBC.

The Week 7 game between the Seattle Seahawks and the Arizona Cardinals ended in a 6-6 tie following a missed field goal from each team in the last minutes of overtime. This became not only the first tie to be featured on Sunday Night Football, but also the first tie not to see a touchdown since 1972, as well as the lowest scoring tie, and the second lowest score in the prime time slot.

After the addition of Thursday Night Football to NBC's rights holdings, the network elected to give Al Michaels time off. Mike Tirico, who left ESPN to become the heir apparent to Michaels at NBC, called select telecasts in his place.

On November 14, 2016, the NFL announced that it had flexed the Chiefs-Broncos game into the Sunday night slot for Week 12, replacing the originally-scheduled New England Patriots-New York Jets game, which was moved to the 4:25 p.m. ET slot as the second game of the doubleheader on CBS.  With the aforementioned Week 16 matchup between the Broncos and the Chiefs already being scheduled for Christmas night (December 25), that was the second time that NBC has shown both meetings of division rivals during a regular season.

On December 4, 2016, the NFL announced that it had flexed the Tampa Bay Buccaneers-Dallas Cowboys game into the Sunday night slot for Week 15, replacing the originally-scheduled Pittsburgh Steelers-Cincinnati Bengals game, which was moved to the 1 p.m. ET slot as the early game on CBS.  As a result, the Cowboys wound up playing on consecutive Sunday nights — on the road against the New York Giants in Week 14 (which they lost, 10-7) and then at home against the Buccaneers in Week 15 (which they won, 26-20), and as a result, the Cowboys wound up playing back-to-back-to-back games on NBC, beginning with their post-Thanksgiving Thursday Night Game against Minnesota, their scheduled Week 14 game against the Giants, as mentioned, and their Week 15 Game against Tampa Bay, which was also previously mentioned.

On January 15, 2017, NBC was scheduled to carry an AFC divisional playoff game with the Chiefs at home against the Steelers in the afternoon; on January 13, the NFL announced that game would move to primetime on NBC the same day due to an ice storm affecting the Kansas City area which would cause perilous travel for fans if the game went on as regularly scheduled, and thus becoming an unexpected bonus Sunday Night Football broadcast in its regular timeslot. NBC filled the vacated afternoon timeslot with a NHL game between the Philadelphia Flyers and Washington Capitals.

2017
The 2017 NFL schedule was released on April 20. NBC's first telecast of the season featured the NFL Kickoff Game between Super Bowl LI champion New England Patriots and the Kansas City Chiefs.

In Week 7, a Sunday night game was scheduled between the Atlanta Falcons and the New England Patriots in a highly-anticipated rematch of Super Bowl LI thus making 2017 the second consecutive season in which a rematch of the previous year's Super Bowl was played during the regular season. This was completely coincidental, as inter-conference opponents only meet once every four years during the regular season. The Patriots won the rematch by a score of 23-7. The television broadcast was noted for its extensive use of the Skycam for game coverage after fog made it impossible to use other cameras.

It also placed a Sunday night game (Pittsburgh Steelers at Detroit Lions) against a World Series game for the eighth straight year. Both the Lions and Steelers have MLB teams in their respective hometowns, but both struggled to get into the playoffs, especially the Pirates, who missed the playoffs for the second year in a row, and the Tigers, who haven't been to the playoffs since winning the AL Central in 2014.

The Thanksgiving night game featured the New York Giants against the Washington Redskins.

In Week 16, due to the fact that Christmas Eve fell on a Sunday, the game between the Minnesota Vikings and the Green Bay Packers aired on Saturday, December 23.

For the second time since flex scheduling went into effect, no Sunday night games were flexed during the season—including (for the first time since NBC got the Sunday night package) Week 17.

This was NBC's second year of producing Thursday Night Football with CBS and NFL Network. In addition to airing 5 Thursday night games, NBC along with NFL Network also aired the Pittsburgh Steelers against the Houston Texans on Christmas Day. NBC/NFL Network simulcasts started in Week 10 with the Seattle Seahawks taking on the Arizona Cardinals.  The NBC Sports-produced Thursday night games on NFL Network began in Week 2, with the Texans battling the Cincinnati Bengals.

Week 17 on December 31 had a full Sunday schedule of games, with the Sunday night game slot originally left blank as has been done the previous nine seasons. After all of the Week 16 Sunday games were played, the NFL determined that many of the teams with playoff implications would have been affected by the results of other football games, and moving a single game to the Sunday night slot impacted competitive balance (along with the possibility of that game having little to no effect on playoff positioning at all, in addition to negative impacts on rating as a result of the game ending close to the stroke of midnight for the New Year for the Eastern time zone). As a result, the NFL decided to instead set up a schedule for that year's Week 17 where all games would be played in the 1 p.m. ET and 4:25 p.m. ET time-slots between CBS and Fox (equivalent to soccer's English Premier League scheduling their last week's matches in the same manner), and no Sunday Night Football game would be played.

This season also marked the year that NBC broadcast Super Bowl LII.

In addition, this season featured four Super Bowl rematches on Sunday Night Football, as well as a fifth in the Super Bowl broadcast itself. First, in Week 3, the Oakland Raiders traveled to Washington to face the Washington Redskins, in a rematch of Super Bowl XVIII. Three weeks later, the New York Giants faced the Denver Broncos, in a rematch of Super Bowl XXI. Then, as previously mentioned, a week later, the Atlanta Falcons went to New England and faced the defending champions New England Patriots, in a rematch of Super Bowl LI. Then in Week 12, the Green Bay Packers faced the Pittsburgh Steelers in a rematch of Super Bowl XLV, in what was supposed to be a quarterback battle between Aaron Rodgers and Ben Roethlisberger, that turned into a quarterback battle between Roethlisberger and Brett Hundley due to Rodgers suffering a broken collarbone in Week 6 that ruled him out for all but one game the rest of the season.  And on NBC's broadcast of Super Bowl LII, the Philadelphia Eagles faced the New England Patriots in a rematch of Super Bowl XXXIX.

2018
The 2018 NFL season schedule was released in April. NBC's first telecast of the season was on September 6, 2018 featured the Super Bowl Champion Philadelphia Eagles defeating the Atlanta Falcons.

For the ninth season in a row, the NFL placed a game against a World Series game, with the (New Orleans Saints at Minnesota Vikings), going up against the fifth (and final) game of the Fall Classic, between the Los Angeles Dodgers  against the Boston Red Sox.

This was also the first season since 2015, that TNF was not on NBC, as it moved to fellow NFL broadcaster Fox for the next five years. Despite the loss of TNF, NBC still broadcasts the Kickoff Game and the Thanksgiving prime time games (both on a Thursday night) as they fall under the current NBC contract.

This marked the seventh year in the Sunday night package that a prime time Thanksgiving game was shown on NBC which featured the Atlanta Falcons against the New Orleans Saints. However, the studio team of Mike Tirico, Tony Dungy and Rodney Harrison called the game in place of Michaels and Collinsworth.

Flexible scheduling rules went into effect Week 5. If a more compelling matchup arose as the season progressed, the previously scheduled Sunday night matchup could have been swapped with the more competitive game's time slot. This occurred several times during the season:

On October 9, NBC and the league announced that the previously scheduled Rams-49ers match-up was moved to a 4:25 p.m. ET start time on CBS, and flexed out for the Bengals-Chiefs match-up, originally scheduled for a 1 p.m. ET start, also on CBS. This meant that the Chiefs wound up playing on back-to-back Sunday nights. Also, this set a new mark for becoming the earliest game to be flexed into SNF, in NBC's whole tenure of covering Sunday Night Football.
On November 5, the league announced that the previously scheduled Steelers-Jaguars match-up was moved to a 1 p.m. ET start time on CBS, and flexed out for the Vikings-Bears match-up, originally scheduled for a 1 p.m. ET start on Fox. And on November 8, the league announced that the Packers-Vikings match-up remained in place, meaning that the Minnesota Vikings also wound up playing on back-to-back Sunday Nights.
On November 14, two more games were flexed into the SNF prime time slot. In Week 13, the 49ers again were flexed out of their original SNF slot, this time, against the division rival Seahawks. It was the second time that the 49ers were flexed out of SNF this season, as their Week 7 game between the NFC West-leading Rams was flexed out for the Bengals-Chiefs game. This game was replaced with the Steelers hosting the 8-3 Los Angeles Chargers, who made their first SNF appearance since 2014.
In Week 14, the Los Angeles Rams, 7 weeks after having their first SNF game flexed out of primetime, travelled to Chicago to take on the NFC North-leading Bears, who hosted their 2nd SNF game in 4 weeks. This game replaced the game featuring the Steelers against the 2-10 Oakland Raiders. Those moves also meant that the city of Los Angeles also had back-to-back Sunday Night Football appearances. With that game, and their home game against the defending Super Bowl Champion Eagles in the Week 15 slot, the Rams wound up playing on back-to-back SNF appearances and the city of Los Angeles had 3-straight weeks with a team on SNF.
On December 23, the NFL finalized the Week 17 schedule, which included a win-and-in game between the Indianapolis Colts and the Tennessee Titans being flexed into that week's SNF slot, with the winner clinching the AFC's final playoff spot and the loser being eliminated.  This game marked the Titans' first appearance on SNF since 2009 (coincidentally, also against the Colts).

In addition, SNF scheduled several rematches from last season's playoffs, including the Saints-Vikings game, the Steelers-Jaguars AFC Divisional game (which was eventually flexed out), and the Falcons-Eagles NFC Divisional game.

SNF had a rules analyst for the first time in program history, as the network added former referee Terry McAulay, who retired after the 2017 season. McAulay has worked three Super Bowls in his tenure as an NFL referee.  Also that same year, McAulay worked the Notre Dame Football games for NBC, with FNIA studio host, Mike Tirico.

2019
The 2019 schedule was released on April 17. However, on March 25, the NFL announced that, in a break from tradition, the Kickoff Game would not be hosted by the reigning Super Bowl champions and would instead featured the Chicago Bears who hosted the Green Bay Packers at Soldier Field on September 5, with the game aired on NBC as part of a number of matchups throughout the league's 100th season celebrating critical games and rivalries through the league's history. The New England Patriots instead hosted the first SNF game of the season against Pittsburgh Steelers during Week 1 on NBC.

For the tenth season in a row the NFL placed a game against a World Series game with the Green Bay Packers against the Kansas City Chiefs, going up against the fifth game of the Fall Classic between the Washington Nationals and the Houston Astros.

Thanksgiving featured a rematch of the previous season's primetime Thanksgiving game between the New Orleans Saints and the Atlanta Falcons. It was the eighth time that the Thanksgiving game was part of the SNF package shown on NBC.

For the second consecutive season, the FNIA team of Tirico, Dungy and Harrison were assigned to work the Thanksgiving primetime game

Flexible scheduling rules went into effect in Week 5; the scheduled game reverted to the afternoon if a more compelling match-up arose as the season progressed. The previously scheduled Sunday Night game could be swapped with the more competitive game's time slot. This occurred several times during the season.

On November 12, the Green Bay Packers versus San Francisco 49ers game was moved from 4:25pm ET on Fox to 8:20pm ET on NBC, replacing the originally scheduled Seattle Seahawks versus Philadelphia Eagles game.
On December 2, the Buffalo Bills versus Pittsburgh Steelers game was moved from 1:00pm ET on CBS to 8:20pm ET on NBC, replacing the originally scheduled Minnesota Vikings versus Los Angeles Chargers game.
On December 9, the NFL extended the deadline for flexing the Week 16 game from the usual 12 days to 6 days before the game, allowing NBC to wait to see what the playoff implications were from the 15 games before deciding to flex the game between the New Orleans Saints and the Tennessee Titans into SNF or to keep the originally scheduled game between the Kansas City Chiefs and the Chicago Bears. The network ultimately chose to keep the originally scheduled game between the Chiefs and Bears.
On December 22, the NFL finalized the Week 17 schedule which included a game between the San Francisco 49ers and the Seattle Seahawks being flexed into that weeks SNF slot with the winner clinching the NFC West Division Title and the loser being the Wild Card.

2020s

2020
The 2020 schedule was released on May 7. The Kickoff game was on September 10, which featured the Super Bowl LIV Champion Kansas City Chiefs hosting the Houston Texans. The Thanksgiving Night game was supposed to feature the Baltimore Ravens versus the Pittsburgh Steelers; the ninth time that the Thanksgiving game would have been part of the SNF package shown on NBC. A COVID-19 outbreak on the Baltimore Ravens forced the postponement of the game to the following Sunday afternoon, which was then postponed to the following Tuesday night, and then finally to Wednesday afternoon.  It was shown on NBC as scheduled, but KWQC-TV - the NBC affiliate for the Quad Cities of Iowa and Illinois - opted not to show the game.  Before this occasion, the last Wednesday night game played in the NFL was also a special edition of primetime on NBC - the 2012 Kickoff game between the Dallas Cowboys and New York Giants that was scheduled as such to avoid a conflict with Obama's renomination speech at that year's Democratic National Convention.

Flexible scheduling rules went into effect in Week 5; the scheduled game reverted to the afternoon if a more compelling game arose. The scheduled SNF game could have been swapped with the more competitive game's time slot. The final game of the season, on Sunday, January 3, 2021, likewise was a flex game. The slot, left blank when the schedule came out, it was filled by the game between the Washington Football Team and the home team Philadelphia Eagles. A Washington win gave them the NFC East Division title.

Mike Tirico substituted for Al Michaels on a select number of games this season, that started with the September 27 game between the Green Bay Packers and the New Orleans Saints. Tirico was initially slated to call the Thanksgiving game this season, but was assigned instead to call the Week 12 SNF game between the Packers and the Chicago Bears with Tony Dungy and Kathryn Tappen. Tirico was eventually given the assignment to call the rescheduled Ravens–Steelers game with Collinsworth after it was postponed from Sunday afternoon to Wednesday afternoon. Tirico has also called NBC's two wild card playoff games in January.

The aforementioned Packers–Saints game took place while the 2020 Stanley Cup Finals (rescheduled from its normal late May–early June schedule) were ongoing; Dallas (Stars) and Tampa Bay (Lightning) also have NFL teams in the Cowboys and Buccaneers. As NBC was also the rightsholder to National Hockey League games in the U.S., the league was compelled to play Games 4 and 5 (September 25–26) of the finals on consecutive nights to avoid conflict with SNF.

For the season, the customary talking head introduction of the offensive and defensive starters was scrapped due to production limitations caused by the COVID-19 pandemic.

For the first time in the history of SNF, NBC aired games against an NBA Finals game in back-to-back weeks; this is usually a non-issue as the NBA Finals traditionally take place in June but were moved to the fall due to the NBA suspending their season. This occurred on October 4 with the Eagles playing the 49ers on the same day as Game 3, and on October 11, with the Vikings playing the Seahawks on the same day as Game 6 (the eventual last game of the series). Although Philadelphia, San Francisco, and Minnesota all have NBA teams, only the 76ers qualified for the playoffs, where they were eliminated in the first round. The Los Angeles Lakers, led by LeBron James and Anthony Davis, defeated the Miami Heat in six games, claiming their 17th championship in franchise history, tying the Boston Celtics for the most in NBA history.

In Week 7, the game between the Seattle Seahawks and Arizona Cardinals was flexed into the Sunday night slot from 4:05 p.m., trading places with the scheduled matchup between the Tampa Bay Buccaneers and Las Vegas Raiders. The shift was not performance-related, as both teams had winning records going into the game. After six Raiders were placed on the COVID-19 list, there were concerns that the game would not be played on Sunday and leave NBC without a broadcast. The Week 7 game marked the eleventh straight year an NFL game aired opposite the World Series.

The Week 15 contest between the Cleveland Browns and New York Giants was moved to Sunday night from a 1:00 p.m. ET kickoff, replacing the San Francisco 49ers and Dallas Cowboys. It was the first time in the history of SNF that Dallas was flexed out of primetime. Michaels' inability to clear NBC protocol for COVID-19 resulted in Tirico working the broadcast with Collinsworth, while Los Angeles Dodgers and Fox Sports broadcaster Joe Davis took Tirico's place on an NFL Network broadcast the previous day.

2021
The 2021 schedule was released on May 12. The Kickoff game, an NBC staple since 2006, was held on September 9. The defending Super Bowl LV champion Tampa Bay Buccaneers, led by Tom Brady, hosted the Dallas Cowboys, led by Dak Prescott, which resulted in a 31-29 win for Tampa Bay. For the 12th straight year, NBC aired a Sunday night game against a World Series game. This year's game featured Prescott and the Cowboys against Dalvin Cook and the Minnesota Vikings. Thanksgiving Night featured an interconference showdown between Josh Allen and the Buffalo Bills against the New Orleans Saints.

Flexible scheduling rules went into effect Week 5; the scheduled game reverted to the afternoon if a more compelling game arose as the season progressed. The scheduled Sunday Night game could be swapped with the more competitive game's time slot. The last game of the season Sunday January 9, 2022 likewise was a flex game. The slot was left blank when the schedule came out. It was filled by the Los Angeles Chargers and the Las Vegas Raiders.

After a one-season hiatus due to COVID-19 production concerns, SNFs trademark "talking heads" introduction for each team's starters was reinstated.

This season marked the year NBC broadcast Super Bowl LVI, the network's fifth Super Bowl under the SNF banner, and the 20th overall. Super Bowl LVI was also scheduled to be the first Super Bowl to be played during an ongoing Olympics event, the 2022 Winter Olympics in Beijing. The rights to the game were originally assigned to CBS, but on March 13, 2019, CBS agreed to trade it to NBC in exchange for Super Bowl LV. With NBC airing both the Olympics and the Super Bowl on the same weekend, the network announced that Mike Tirico would work both events. Tirico started by flying out to Beijing for the first few days of the Games, then flying back to Los Angeles to host primetime coverage and Super Bowl LVI from SoFi Stadium. Tirico then flew east to Stamford, Connecticut, where NBC Sports’ main headquarters are, to host the rest of the Olympics.

As with the previous season, Tirico filled in for Al Michaels in select SNF games, including the Thanksgiving game. Maria Taylor, who joined NBC from ESPN/ABC, became the secondary studio host in games Tirico does play-by-play. In addition, Drew Brees was added as a second analyst, both in the studio and in-game. Kathryn Tappen, NBC's sideline reporter for Notre Dame Football games, filled in for Michele Tafoya on the sidelines during Weeks 12-14.

On November 23, 2021, NFL announced a rivalry game between the 49ers and Seahawks was the only game flex out in favor of a Broncos and Chiefs game due to an injury to Seahawks quarterback Russell Wilson and after the Seahawks' loss against Steelers in overtime 23–20.

The talking heads introductions were not used in the Saturday AFC Wild Card Playoff game, but it was used in the Sunday Night AFC Wild Card and NFC Divisional Round. The music used was "The Way You Move".

Coincidentally, the first Super Bowl aired on NBC (in a simulcast with CBS), and this season's Super Bowl, were both played in Los Angeles, with Super Bowl I being played at the LA Coliseum, and Super Bowl LVI being played at SoFi Stadium. Super Bowl LVI was also the final game for Tafoya and Michaels.

2022
The 2022 schedule was released on May 12, 2022. The Kickoff game was held on September 8, 2022 with the defending Super Bowl LVI champion Los Angeles Rams hosted the Buffalo Bills, which resulted in a 31-10 win for Buffalo. After six years of waiting to take over full-time, Mike Tirico replaced Al Michaels as lead play-by-play after the latter left for Amazon, while NFL Network's Melissa Stark replaced Michele Tafoya on the sidelines. However, Michaels will be on select SNF and playoff telecasts in an emeritus role and a fill in for Tirico.

This season marked the first time that SNF did not go head-to-head with a World Series game as Major League Baseball scheduled a travel day for the American League's Houston Astros and the National League's Philadelphia Phillies on October 30, between Games 2 and 3. With Game 3 scheduled for October 31 postponed the following day due to rain in Philadelphia and every subsequent game pushed back by one day, the Week 9 SNF contest featuring the Tennessee Titans and Kansas City Chiefs would compete with Game 7 of the World Series should the latter game be necessary. However, the seventh game became moot when the Astros won the championship in six games.

In Week 11, the NFL announced a scheduling change that flexed out a rivalry game between the Cincinnati Bengals and the Pittsburgh Steelers in favor of a game between the Kansas City Chiefs and the Los Angeles Chargers. As the Chargers had back-to-back games on Sunday night after the Week 10 game against the San Francisco 49ers, this was the first time in 4 years that a team has played back-to-back Sunday Night Football games since the Kansas City Chiefs and the Los Angeles Rams.

In Week 14, the NFL announced a scheduling change that flexed out a rivalry game between the Kansas City Chiefs and the Denver Broncos in favor of the Miami Dolphins and the Los Angeles Chargers. This would be the Dolphins' second appearance on SNF after they beat the Steelers in Week 7. And this will also be the second time in 4 weeks that the Chargers have hosted a Sunday Night Football game.

In Week 15, the NFL announced a scheduling change that flexed out a game between the New England Patriots–Las Vegas Raiders game that was flexed out in favor of the New York Giants–Washington Commanders. This was marked the Commanders' first appearance as a new name. This was also marked the Giants' return to SNF in 2 years.

On Christmas Day, the NFL announced a scheduling change in Week 17. The Los Angeles Rams–Los Angeles Chargers game was flexed out in favor of the Pittsburgh Steelers–Baltimore Ravens game. Due to the Rams QB injury Matthew Stafford (as only game for Rams on NBC after they lost against the Bills 31–10). This marks for the 11th time a rivalry game between the Steelers and the Ravens will be seeing each other again on SNF (last SNF game in 2020 the Steelers beat Ravens 19-14). This was also marked the Steelers' second appearance after they lost against the Dolphins and got flexed out against the Bengals. As well the Ravens' second appearance after they beat against the Bengals.

Thanksgiving Night featured an interconference matchup between Mac Jones and the New England Patriots against Dalvin Cook and the Minnesota Vikings.

Flexible scheduling rules went into effect in Week 5; the scheduled game will revert to the afternoon if a more compelling game arises as the season progress. The scheduled SNF game will revert to the afternoon the scheduled game could be swapped with the more competitive game's time slot. The final game of the season is likewise is a flex game the slot was left blank when the schedule came out. It was filled by the Detroit Lions and the Green Bay Packers and played on January 8, 2023.  (For the first time since SNF began, neither team that participated in the final telecast qualified for the playoffs that season.  The Lions, which had been eliminated earlier in the day when the Seattle Seahawks defeated the Los Angeles Rams, beat the Packers, 20-16; the result qualified the Seahawks for the playoffs.)

In addition, there are four Super Bowl rematches on Sunday Night Football for the 2022 season. The first one in Week 3 featured a rematch of Super Bowl XXIV between the 49ers and the Broncos. The second one in Week 4 was a rematch of Super Bowl LV between the Chiefs and the Buccaneers. In Week 10, the 49ers hosted the Chargers in a rematch of Super Bowl XXIX. Finally, Week 13 featured a rematch of Super Bowl V between the Colts and the Cowboys.

Similarities to ABC's NFL coverage
Much of NBC's SNF production crew comes from ABC/ESPN, including Fred Gaudelli and Drew Esocoff (who respectively serve as producer and director of the broadcasts), as ESPN moved most of its previous Sunday night crew over to Monday Night Football. Michaels, Madden and Andrea Kremer also came to NBC directly from ABC/ESPN, and Football Night in Americas Sterling Sharpe was a member of ESPN's Sunday NFL Countdown in recent years (calling several Sunday night games for the network in 2005). With regard to using ABC/ESPN talent, NBC Sports chairman Dick Ebersol said, "I was not interested in the quote, unquote vanity of starting anew ... There's not a lot of room for experimentation."

In addition, NBC has the starters for each team introduce themselves on each side of the ball (though the strict "player name/position/playing college" introductions of the past have been relaxed, and now players can list their birthplace or high school in the last part rather than their playing college, or even their college's common nickname, such as Miami (FL)'s "The U"), much as ABC did in the last few years of its run, and the short post-game show (done to allow affiliates to start their late newscasts) follows a similar format to ABC's.  As of Week 9 of the 2016 NFL season, this practice was also used on the NBC-produced Thursday Night Football broadcasts on NBC and/or NFL Network.

Michaels and Madden ended each telecast in the 2007 and 2008 NFL seasons by selecting an MVP for that night's game to receive the Horse Trailer award (with a photo of each recipient being affixed to the side of a production truck, also known as a "horse trailer"). This concept originated from Madden's days with CBS, where he invented the similar "Turkey Leg Award" for the Thanksgiving Day game in 1989 (he later took the concept to Fox, then expanded it to every game of the year with the Horse Trailer Award when he joined ABC in 2002). In the 2006 season, the MVP concept was modified slightly, where the game's MVP was called the "Rock Star of the Game" and had his photo placed on a display at the "Top of the Rock" observation deck atop 30 Rockefeller Plaza, NBC's New York headquarters, in New York. When Madden retired following Super Bowl XLIII, the Horse Trailer Player of the Game award was discontinued.

The following local TV stations have carried both MNF and SNF during their histories.  (Unless otherwise noted, these stations have been NBC affiliates for the entire run of SNF.)
KBMT Beaumont, Texas (MNF from 1970–2005 on channel 12.1 (digital) and channel 12 (analog), SNF since 2009 on channel 12.2)
KNSD San Diego (MNF from 1973–1977 as KCST)
KNTV San Jose (MNF from 1970–1999; although licensed to a city in the San Francisco media market, it served the Monterey Peninsula and the Santa Cruz area at the time of ABC affiliation)
KOMU-TV Columbia, Missouri (MNF from 1982–1985)
KUSA Denver (MNF from 1970–1995 [Week 1], 1970–1984 as KBTV)
WAND Decatur, Illinois (MNF from 1970-2004)
WDTN Dayton, Ohio (MNF from 1980–2004)
WNWO Toledo, Ohio (MNF from 1970–1995 [Week 8], 1970–1986 as WDHO)
WNYT Albany, New York (MNF from 1970–1977 [Week 4] as WAST)
WRAL-TV Raleigh, North Carolina (MNF from 1970–1984, SNF since 2016)
WREX Rockford, Illinois (MNF from 1970–1994)
WTHR Indianapolis (MNF from 1970–1978, 1970–1975 as WLW-I)
WVLA-TV Baton Rouge, Louisiana (MNF from 1971–1977 as WRBT)
WXIA-TV Atlanta (MNF from 1970–1980, 1970–1973 as WQXI)

Theme music
Academy Award winner John Williams composed the instrumental theme music, titled "Wide Receiver," for Sunday Night Football. For Super Bowl XLIII, NBC commissioned Joel Beckerman of Man Made Music to create new instrumental cues adding techno and rock elements around the main brass melody. These cues replaced the original Williams arrangements full-time at the start of the 2009 season. Singer Pink sang the theme song for the broadcast in 2006, a reworking of the Joan Jett song "I Hate Myself for Loving You" retitled "Waiting All Day for Sunday Night". Several alternative versions were used throughout the season, substituting different lyrics when appropriate (such as "Waiting All Year For Sunday Night" (During week 1 of each season) or "Waiting All Day For A Wild Card Fight").

In 2007, country singer Faith Hill replaced Pink as the singer of the opening theme, and a new arrangement of the Joan Jett song coincided with her debut. The Faith Hill intro, in particular, was not without criticism and parody. The intro was lampooned in the October 9, 2010 episode of Saturday Night Live, with host Jane Lynch as Hill (with Jason Sudeikis as Al Michaels and Bill Hader as Cris Collinsworth). In the 30 Rock episode "Season 4", the character of Jenna Maroney (Jane Krakowski) sings what appears to be an allusion to the Faith Hill intro for NBC's fictional Tennis Night in America program. In the South Park episode entitled "Faith Hilling", Eric Cartman sings an obvious spoof of Hill's actual Sunday Night Football song. On April 15, 2013, Hill announced that she would no longer sing the intro song for Sunday Night Football.

The use of the reworked Joan Jett song is another similarity to ABC's Monday Night Football coverage. From 1989 to 2011 and again beginning in 2017, Hank Williams Jr. opens MNF with a reworking of his song "All My Rowdy Friends Are Coming Over Tonight" entitled "All My Rowdy Friends Are Back for Monday Night (Are You Ready for Some Football?)".

On October 7, 2012, The Soul Rebels had a featured performance on Sunday Night Football, performing the show's theme song.

It was announced May 7, 2013, that Carrie Underwood would take over singing the theme song.

A new Carrie Underwood-sung theme known as "Oh, Sunday Night", which takes elements from her 2014 duet hit with Miranda Lambert, "Somethin' Bad", premiered with the opening game of the 2016 season on September 11.

For NBC's coverage of Thursday Night Football in 2016 and 2017, A capella group Pentatonix sung the opening theme song called "Weekend Go." The song is a reworked version of their original song "Sing." NBC also used the TNF main theme music called "Can't Hold Us Down," performed by members of the Broadway orchestra for Hamilton.

In 2018, Underwood, along with songwriters Chris DeStefano and Brett James, wrote and recorded a brand new song for SNF, called "Game On", replacing "Oh, Sunday Night," which had been the opening theme since 2016. In addition, Joel Beckerman, who had orchestrated the main theme since Super Bowl XLIII, reorchestrated the main theme, for the first time since Super Bowl XLVI. Underwood faced criticism over the song, which led to her, NBC, and the NFL being sued by singer Heidi Merrill for plagiarism.

The plagiarism lawsuit of "Game On" led to NBC bringing back "Waiting All Day for Sunday Night", which was the original opening song, until it was replaced in 2016. Underwood returned, and in 2019, the open featured Joan Jett, and her band The Blackhearts. The open was shot inside of Mercedes-Benz Stadium, which was the first time that the SNF open was shot inside of an NFL stadium, instead of a soundstage.

Show opening
The song is at the centerpiece of the opening montage, which has changed several times over the years. Carrie Underwood's music has always played in the background over the official welcome after the opening is completed and the teams take the field.

Pink

2006
For the first season, Pink appeared to sing from the top of a skyscraper as a helicopter zoomed down on a city skyline with enlarged players Shaun Alexander, LaDainian Tomlinson and Tom Brady and the field, the results of computer-generated imagery. A television monitor, which resembles the monitor at Times Square leased at the time by NBC, showed game preview footage and opening credits.

Faith Hill

2007
Faith Hill, who replaced Pink as the theme song's performer, sang on a stage while some of the key players in the game and announcers Al Michaels and John Madden arrived in limousines and walk on a red carpet as they head to a simulated theater. The marquee outside the theater showed the logo of then-official NFL communications partner Sprint, which paid a product placement fee, and one of the "bystanders" recorded the red carpet scene on a Sprint camera phone. Access Hollywood co-hosts Shaun Robinson and Tony Potts also appeared in the opening. In addition, some of the lyrics were changed slightly and the musical arrangement tilts toward country more than rock, to reflect the change in singers.

2008
The 2008 opening, which debuted on September 7, takes place in a stadium. Hill performed and danced surrounded by video screens with simulated game action, and the song ended with a computer-generated fireworks display. Once again, a Sprint camera phone was used, this time by a fan. Among the spectators were NFL stars Ray Lewis and Antonio Gates. Again, there were some lyrics changes, among them was the substitution of the lyrics "last one standing better turn out the lights."

Super Bowl XLIII
A special intro sequence was used for Super Bowl XLIII on February 1, 2009. Hill performed with CGI blue neon lights and video screens in the settings of the background and at the end of the video, the Vince Lombardi Trophy entered through pouring water, showing the trophy in front of the city of Tampa (the host city of Super Bowl XLIII).

2009
For 2009, Hill appeared in the intro sequence performed in a closed-studio setting, surrounded by video monitors, neon lights and a message board that displayed the names of the production staff. Sprint returned for more product placement, as a branded cell phone appeared to give an alert that the game was about to start.

2010
Hill was seen in front of a Ford Mustang convertible as the song began, overlooking a bluff; the scene was taped in the Hollywood Hills in California. A number of NFL stars appeared in front of various landmarks throughout the United States, including Peyton Manning at the Indianapolis Motor Speedway, Eli Manning at Times Square, DeSean Jackson at the Philadelphia Museum of Art, Larry Fitzgerald in the Sonoran Desert in Arizona and Drew Brees on Bourbon Street in New Orleans. Hill herself drove down a road with some simulated billboards with the opening credits and a product placement ad for Verizon (which replaced Sprint as the league's telecommunications sponsor) and was also seen at the Washington Monument. Some of the lyrics changed yet again; for example, the opening line once again asked, "Alright, Sunday night, where are you?" Hill gathered with the NFL stars on a football field inside a stadium at the end of the video.

In Week 16, the introduction did not air due to the game moving to Tuesday night and time constraints.

2011
There were a few significant changes from the previous year, including Hill (who herself returned for her fifth year as part of the telecast's opening) arriving in a motorcycle. In addition, Verizon returned for more product placement. Most of the scenes, including the NFL stars' appearances in front of various landmarks throughout the U.S. and Hill at the Washington Monument (with the minor difference being her wardrobe), were repeated from 2010, however several new NFL stars appeared, including Adrian Peterson and Brian Urlacher; in the last few seconds of the sequence, all of them gathered on a computer-generated football field. In another notable change, the opening credits were dropped for the season. J. Ivy, a spoken word poet from Chicago who has worked with Kanye West and Jay-Z, also appears during the opening.

Super Bowl XLVI
Hill performed another special Super Bowl version of the song at the start of the network's broadcast of Super Bowl XLVI on February 5, 2012. With computer-generated technology, this was filmed in a closed-studio setting, with her walking surrounded by video screens showing clips from past Super Bowl games. A Verizon smartphone (product placement) was seen at the beginning of the video sequence.

2012
Some changes were made to the show's opening for the 2012 season, which included Hill walking through the tunnel towards the stage. She then performed with a rock band in front of a live audience, with video screens in the background. Shortly after the start of the song, guests appeared on the computer-generated video screens each week (such as three of the judges from The Voice for Week 1, the Chicago Fire Department for Week 3 and the girls Goldie Rocky and Shania from The New Normal for Week 5) singing the line, "We want it too!" The live audience used their smartphones to form the Verizon logo. NFL stars were also seen going through the tunnel with moving CG images of city landmarks, players and team logos. Initially, the stars presented were Aaron Rodgers (Green Bay Packers), Clay Matthews (Packers), Ray Lewis (Baltimore Ravens), Patrick Willis (San Francisco 49ers), Jimmy Graham (New Orleans Saints), DeMarcus Ware (Dallas Cowboys), Calvin Johnson (Detroit Lions), Larry Fitzgerald (Arizona Cardinals), Jared Allen (Minnesota Vikings), Rob Gronkowski (New England Patriots), Darrelle Revis (New York Jets) and Eli Manning (New York Giants). The opening itself was remixed with Nick Mangold (Jets) and LeSean McCoy (Philadelphia Eagles) filling in for Ray Lewis and Darrelle Revis.

Beginning with this season, the opening title sequence was not used at the start of the NBC Sunday Night Football Thanksgiving Special broadcast. This opening was also not used on December 16, 2012, two days after the Sandy Hook shooting.

Carrie Underwood

2013
Carrie Underwood became the performer for the theme song for the 2013 season, replacing Faith Hill. Her intro debuted on September 8, with the theme arrangement itself tilted even more towards country to reflect the change in singers. In this animation sequence, Carrie Underwood performed on stage inside a computer-generated stadium. Verizon also returned for more product placement. Some of the NFL stars appearing in this opening included Andrew Luck (Indianapolis Colts), Eli Manning (Giants), Peyton Manning (Denver Broncos), Clay Matthews (Packers) and J. J. Watt (Houston Texans). The animation ended with the NBC Sunday Night Football logo written in laser lighting.

Beginning with this season, the opening was not used for any and all playoff games aired on NBC with the exception of the Super Bowl.

2014
Underwood continued her role as Sunday Night Footballs show opener, which debuted on September 7. Once again, Verizon returned to provide product placement. Some of the NFL stars that were represented in the opening were Philip Rivers (San Diego Chargers), Luke Kuechly (Carolina Panthers), DeMarcus Ware (Broncos), Clay Matthews (Packers), Brandon Marshall (Chicago Bears), Jimmy Graham (Saints), LeSean McCoy (Eagles) and Colin Kaepernick (49ers). This time, she was seen performing on a computer-generated stage. In another major tweak, the lyrics toward the end of the song changed, with the commentators' first names (Al and Cris) being replaced with "come on along with the best on TV."

Super Bowl XLIX
Underwood performed a special Super Bowl version of the song at the start of the network's broadcast of Super Bowl XLIX on February 1, 2015. In this version, she is performing with a rock band in concert with video screens showing scenes from past Super Bowl games inside a CGI rendering of University of Phoenix Stadium, the site of Super Bowl XLIX. The Patriots' Tom Brady, Rob Gronkowski and Darrelle Revis, as well as the Seattle Seahawks' Russell Wilson and Kam Chancellor, appeared in the opening. Verizon provided product placement.

2015
Underwood returned for her third year as part of the show's opening on September 13.  Once again, she was seen performing on a computer-generated stage. Product placement was once again provided by Verizon, which introduced its newest company logo that September.

2016
Underwood returned for her fourth season on September 11, with "Oh, Sunday Night" replacing "Waiting All Day For Sunday Night" as the new intro for SNF.  In this open, Underwood was seen at the stadium entrance in front of a bus. Upon entering the stadium, she goes into the SNF broadcast booth with Al Michaels (play-by-play) and Cris Collinsworth (color). She was then seen going down the steps before entering the locker room with the players and then walking past a row of cheerleaders.  Michele Tafoya (sideline reporter) also appears in the open, as does product placement by Verizon. As Underwood left the computer-generated stadium at the end of the open, the SNF logo was lit up between the two computer-generated pyrotechnics displays and finally, the sliding doors seen above the logo slid open while going into a live shot.

2017
Underwood returned for her fifth season on September 10.  The opening sequence began with a skyline and a Verizon logo (product placement) on the lower left of the screen. Underwood was seen wearing a red dress while walking down the street before performing on stage. Various NFL stars also appeared in the opening.

Super Bowl LII
Rather than singing a special version of "Oh Sunday Night", done in previous years with "Waiting All Day for Sunday Night", Underwood recorded, and performed "The Champion" featuring rapper Ludacris as the opening sequence to Super Bowl LII, with product placement by Verizon.

2018
Underwood returned for her sixth season on September 9. "Game On" replaced "Oh Sunday Night" as the opening theme. In the open, she was singing into a microphone with video screens in the background. Underwood was joined by several NFL stars before the cheerleaders joined her. The open ended with Underwood on the rooftop of a skyscraper. In another significant change, the logo of Pepsi (the official soft drink of the NFL, which paid a product placement fee) was shown. It replaced Verizon as the product placement sponsor in the SNF open. Although the Kickoff Game had no intro, NBC used a snippet of Underwood's song The Champion, to commemorate the Eagles' Super Bowl Championship, which then led into the championship banner unveiling, the singing of "Fly, Eagles Fly", and the introduction of the Super Bowl Champion Eagles, all led by Hall of Famer Brian Dawkins.

As in recent years, the intro was not seen before the Thanksgiving game. However, NBC created a special intro featuring chef Emeril Lagasse and New Orleans-born jazz musician Trombone Shorty.

2019
Underwood returned for her seventh season on September 8, when her new intro for SNF debuted during Week 1. As previously mentioned, she teamed with rock music legend Joan Jett for the return of the original SNF opening theme song, "Waiting All Day For Sunday Night." Product placement was once again provided by Pepsi and the opening sequence was filmed inside Mercedes-Benz Stadium in Atlanta, making this the first time the open was filmed inside an actual NFL stadium.

As in recent years, the intro was not seen before the Thanksgiving game. However, like the year before, NBC created a special intro for the game. This year, the intro featured Atlanta-based country group Zac Brown Band performing a rewritten version of their song Chicken Fried.

2020
Underwood returned for her eighth season on September 13. This season's intro was very unique, as due to the ongoing COVID-19 pandemic, an intro could not be filmed. Instead, the intro was filmed remotely, with players and fans making cameos from home.

NBC had also planned to air a special intro for the Thanksgiving game for the third straight year, this year, starring Milo Ventimiglia from NBC's hit show This is Us. However, because the game was postponed to the Wednesday afternoon after Thanksgiving, the intro was scrapped altogether.

2021
Underwood returned for her ninth season on September 12. This season's intro was featured with NFL players along with reporters, fans tailgating in the parking lot and some of SNF's finest moments.  Also, Uber Eats replaced Pepsi as the sponsor of the Sunday Night Football open.  The intro ends with a computer-generated fireworks display, similar to that of 2008.

The Thanksgiving Night intro returned for 2021. This year featured New Orleans native Branford Marsalis narrating a special video essay.

Super Bowl LVI
NBC's opening started with an impromptu commercial for Visit California and features movie clips of famous football movies, clips from previous Super Bowl games and cameo appearances by Hollywood actors and Super Bowl luminaries, starring actress Halle Berry. Underwood did make a cameo in the commercial, singing a parody of her hit song "Before He Cheats" related to The Blind Side (acting as if it was a musical), with the title line being changed to "Maybe next time he'll beg before he calls a sneak".

2022
Underwood returned for her 10th season on September 11. This season's intro underwent an overhaul to match the new logo and package introduced for SNF. The intro starts with a computer-generated fireworks display before panning down towards a concert venue where Underwood performs, cutting between the performance and clips of the teams. Aspects of previous SNF intros made their return, with some melodies from previous years being reintroduced. The intro ends with a pan up towards the fireworks display with the new SNF logo.

Graphics

2006–2008

The graphics, logos and scoreboard for NBC's Sunday Night Football telecasts were designed by Troika Design Group, along with the city skyline graphics used in the introductions to both Football Night in America and the games proper. It was effectively the first time the network used permanent time/score boxes throughout any of their sports broadcasts outside of Olympic Games broadcasts, where permanent scoring displays were compulsory; prior to 2006, the network continued the previous mode of presenting the scores on-screen for a short time every few minutes or so, a method common in American sports broadcasting until Fox introduced constant scoring displays in 1994.

NBC's game telecasts use the same type of horizontal bottom-screen scoreboard that Monday Night Football used in the 2005 NFL season (and was subsequently used by ABC Sports until its rebranding in August 2006). After its debut, the graphics also began to be phased in across other NBC Sports properties, including its coverage of Notre Dame football and the annual Bayou Classic game (which uses exactly the same graphics used on SNF broadcasts), National Hockey League coverage (which uses the SNF graphics but with a scoreboard on the top), and tennis and golf (which use a modified version influenced by the look, but with bolder text for readability purposes). NBC's Olympics coverage continues to use a different package mixed between NBC's graphics and those of the IOC's world feed. The NBC football graphics are also used, in some form or another, on certain locally produced preseason telecasts carried by NBC owned-and-operated stations and affiliates that serve as flagship outlets for NFL teams (such as New York Giants preseason games on WNBC, and the Minnesota Vikings on KARE-TV).

2009–2011
 
NBC's bottom-line scoring banner underwent a significant revamp for the 2009 season, although it debuted during the network's Super Bowl XLIII coverage on February 1, 2009. The changes included presenting downs and yardage in a feather derived from NBC's iconic peacock logo in the colors of the team currently on offense. In addition, when a team scores a touchdown, the banner will open, the team's logo and initials will slide to the left of the banner and "TOUCHDOWN" is displayed in the remainder of the banner. After a few moments, the banner will show the drive information. Then the banner returns to normal and show the change in the team's score. Additionally (beginning with Week 9), timeout indicators were added below each team's respective scores. For the 2010 season, the timeout indicators were changed to three white trapezoids below the team abbreviations, and the play clock was moved from above the team in possession of the football to above the game clock (for the final two minutes of regulation and if necessary, overtime). The down markers also changed in 2010, which is now featuring the team logo next to the down marker.

2012–2014
 
On January 2, 2012, during the NHL Winter Classic (with a sneak two days before during a Notre Dame hockey game on Versus), the graphics of all of NBC Sports' productions were updated to a new package intended to unify the graphical image between both the network and the rebranded NBC Sports Network, which relaunched that same day. Subsequently, on Wild Card Saturday (January 7), the network's NFL presentation was changed to the new graphical styling to match the style and layout of the then-recently christened NBC Sports Network. Most of the banner's styling remains the same, but with a cleaner and larger font for readability and a more neutral NBC logo to the left rather than the "aggressive peacock" used since 2006. Elements such as team and individual player stats take on team colors (main color as the background, secondary color as the accent), and the down/yardage/possession graphic also takes on team coloring, with neutral team comparison stats and other elements having a gold/blue/black coloring. Additionally, the play clock appeared directly above the game clock throughout the entire game.

Beginning with the 2014 Hall of Fame Game on August 3, 2014, the play clock was moved to the right side, next to the down/yardage graphic, of the bottom-screen score banner, which itself remained in the 4:3 safe area. In addition, beginning with the NFL Kickoff Special on September 4, 2014, an electronic green-colored line-of-scrimmage marker was added to the virtual on-field graphic. NBC's Sunday Night Football was also the last of the five NFL broadcast partners to switch to a full 16:9 letterbox presentation on its 4:3 standard-definition feed, a downscaled version of the HD feed's native 16:9 format (utilizing the Active Format Description #10 flag), following Fox (2010), ESPN's Monday Night Football (2011), NFL Network's Thursday Night Football (2012) and CBS (2013). Some of the graphics were also re-positioned.

2015–2017
On January 3, 2015, during the Wild Card playoffs, NBC Sports debuted a revamped graphics package for its NFL coverage on Wild Card Saturday Night, which is formatted for the 16:9 letterbox presentation. The package was part of a new graphics set introduced across NBC Sports' properties on January 1, 2015, during its coverage of the Premier League and the 2015 NHL Winter Classic.

On November 3, 2016, during the Atlanta Falcons-Tampa Bay Buccaneers game on NFL Network, NBC Sports debuted a separate graphics package for their production of Thursday Night Football, which is completely different from the CBS Sports version.  The score bar, which is similar in design to the SNF version, is also seen at the bottom of the screen, with the NBC/NFL Network co-branding on the left side of the bar.  However, the timeout indicators on NBC's TNF score bar are stacked to the right of the team's abbreviations, as opposed to underneath them on the network's own SNF score bar. For the 2017 season, TNF games produced by NBC but aired exclusively on NFL Network outside of team markets have the NBC logos removed but use the same graphics and theme music.

NBC Sports opted to use this graphics package for Notre Dame football broadcasts.

2018–2021
NBC debuted a new graphics package specifically for Sunday Night Football during Super Bowl LII, began to be used full-time 2018 season. Producer Fred Gaudelli stated that the network wanted SNF to have a more distinctive presentation to set them apart from other NBC Sports telecasts. For the 2018 season, NBC also debuted a new on-air feature known as the "green zone"; on third and fourth downs, the distance from the line of scrimmage to the first down line is digitally shaded on the field to be a darker shade of green. The feature received mixed reviews from critics and viewers, who considered it distracting and redundant to the existing yellow first down line that had historically been a standard feature of U.S. football telecasts. The Ringers Rodger Sherman considered it "the ultimate conclusion of graphics creep". Gaudelli stated that the green zone was developed for when Skycam is used as a primary camera angle, but it was decided to use the effect on all games.

2022–present
NBC debuted a new on-air graphics package for Sunday Night Football during Super Bowl LVI, including a "pod"-like scoreboard in the center of the screen (reminiscent of one introduced by Fox in 2020) anchored by a circular hub containing the game clock, and capable of retracting itself to the side of the screen to fit statistical graphics. For the first time, NBC also introduced a new logo for Sunday Night Football and its associated programs, replacing the previous pentagon-shaped "shield" logo used since its premiere with a more minimalistic wordmark better-suited for multi-platform usage. It was also the first NBC property to use a refresh of the network's long-time peacock logo, whose rollout began in earnest in late-December 2022. During Telemundo's Spanish broadcast of select games (including Super Bowl LVI), the network's stylized "T" logo was used instead of NBC's peacock logo in the main English broadcast.

International broadcasts
In Canada, Sunday Night Football is aired by TSN, as well as CTV 2 for simsub purposes since the 2017 season under the NFL's current media rights. It is also aired in the UK by Sky Sports, corporate sibling to NBC since Comcast's acquisition of Sky, and in Australia by 7mate.

In Brazil, SNF is broadcast on ESPN Brasil, with the original English audio available as a separate feed via second audio program. Brazilian Portuguese audio is hosted by Fernando Nardini on play-by-play and Paulo Antunes as color commentator; Ari Aguiar/Renan do Couto fills in occasionally as play-by-play and Antony Curti as color commentator.

The Sunday Night Football telecasts are also aired in Latin America by ESPN Latin America, with Álvaro Martín as play-by-play announcer and Raúl Allegre providing color commentary.

In the Philippines, Sunday Night Football, alongside other primetime games, is aired by Premier Sports beginning with the 2021 season.

Nielsen ratings

Through the first four weeks of the 2010 NFL season, Sunday Night Football had an average total viewership of 22.9 million viewers, the most for the first four weeks of a prime time NFL package in 14 years (since ABC earned a 24.0 million average viewership in 1996 on four broadcasts of Monday Night Football).

The Washington Redskins–Dallas Cowboys game on December 30, 2012 was the highest-rated Sunday Night Football broadcast ever, earning 30.426 million viewers (22.074 million during the period from 8:31 to 11:25 p.m. Eastern Time) and a household rating of 12.7. This also made it the most watched regular-season primetime game in 16 years, since a November 18, 1996 Monday Night Football game on ABC between the Green Bay Packers and the Cowboys (which was watched by 31.5 million viewers).

For the 2013 season, Sunday Night Football averaged 21.9 million viewers (for 15 broadcasts, as well as the Turkey Bowl) in 2013, up 5% versus its viewership in 2012, and an increase of 3% with a 12.9 household rating. In terms of sheer reach, this marked the highest average viewership for an NFL prime time package since 1996. Its highest rated game telecast was the Denver Broncos and Indianapolis Colts on October 20, 2013, which was watched by 26.9 million viewers.

See also
 NFL on NBC
 NFL on CBS
 NFL on Fox
 Monday Night Football
 ESPN Sunday Night Football
 TNT Sunday Night Football
 Sunday Night Football (radio)
 Thursday Night Football
Cowboys–Eagles rivalry Both teams was tied. 8–8 series
Cowboys–Giants rivalry  Cowboys lead over Giants. 8–4 series
Commanders–Cowboys rivalry Cowboys lead over Commanders. 5-2 series
Eagles–Giants rivalry Eagles lead over Giants. 5–2 series
Bears–Packers rivalry Packers lead over Bears. 9–2 series
Packers–Vikings rivalry Both teams was Tied 4-4 series
Ravens–Steelers rivalry Ravens lead over Steelers. 6–5 series
Colts–Patriots rivalry Colts lead over Patriots. 3–2 series
Broncos–Chiefs rivalry Chiefs lead over Broncos. 4–2 series

References

External links
 
Others
 
 New NBC talking heads have history across NFL telecasts
 Sunday Night Football NFLTV

2006 American television series debuts
2010s American television series
Sunday Night Football
Nielsen ratings winners
Sunday Night Football
NBC original programming
NBCSN shows
Telemundo
NBC Sports